The 1984 La Flèche Wallonne was the 48th edition of La Flèche Wallonne cycle race and was held on 12 April 1984. The race started in Charleroi and finished in Huy. The race was won by Kim Andersen of the COOP–Hoonved team.

General classification

References

1984 in road cycling
1984
1984 in Belgian sport
1984 Super Prestige Pernod International